There are a number of standards related to cryptography. Standard algorithms and protocols provide a focus for study; standards for popular applications attract a large amount of cryptanalysis.

Encryption standards
 Data Encryption Standard (DES, now obsolete)
 Advanced Encryption Standard (AES)
 RSA the original public key algorithm
 OpenPGP

Hash standards
 MD5 128-bit (obsolete)
 SHA-1 160-bit (obsolete)
 SHA-2 available in 224, 256, 384, and 512-bit variants
 HMAC keyed hash
 PBKDF2 Key derivation function (RFC 2898)

Digital signature standards
 Digital Signature Standard (DSS), based on the Digital Signature Algorithm (DSA)
 RSA
 Elliptic Curve DSA

Public-key infrastructure (PKI) standards
 X.509 Public Key Certificates

Wireless Standards
 Wired Equivalent Privacy (WEP), severely flawed and superseded by WPA
 Wi-Fi Protected Access (WPA) better than WEP, a 'pre-standard' partial version of 802.11i
 802.11i a.k.a. WPA2, uses AES and other improvements on WEP
 A5/1 and A5/2 cell phone encryption for GSM

U.S. Government Federal Information Processing Standards  (FIPS)

FIPS PUB 31 Guidelines for Automatic Data Processing Physical Security and  Risk Management 1974
FIPS PUB 46-3 Data Encryption Standard (DES) 1999
FIPS PUB 73 Guidelines for Security of Computer Applications 1980
FIPS PUB 74 Guidelines for Implementing and Using the NBS Data Encryption Standard 1981
FIPS PUB 81 DES Modes of Operation 1980
FIPS PUB 102 Guideline for Computer Security Certification and Accreditation  1983
FIPS PUB 112 Password Usage 1985, defines 10 factors to be considered in  access control systems that  are based on passwords
FIPS PUB 113 Computer Data Authentication 1985, specifies a Data Authentication Algorithm  (DAA) based on DES, adopted by the Department of Treasury and the  banking community to protect electronic fund transfers.
FIPS PUB 140-2 Security Requirements for Cryptographic Modules 2001, defines four increasing security levels
FIPS PUB 171 Key Management Using ANSI X9.17 (ANSI X9.17-1985) 1992, based on DES
FIPS PUB 180-2 Secure Hash Standard (SHS) 2002 defines the SHA family
FIPS PUB 181 Automated Password Generator (APG) 1993
FIPS PUB 185 Escrowed Encryption Standard (EES) 1994, a key escrow system that provides for decryption  of telecommunications when lawfully authorized.
FIPS PUB 186-2 Digital Signature Standard (DSS) 2000
FIPS PUB 190 Guideline for the Use of Advanced Authentication Technology Alternatives  1994
FIPS PUB 191 Guideline for the Analysis of local area network Security 1994
FIPS PUB 196 Entity Authentication Using Public Key Cryptography 1997
FIPS PUB 197 Advanced Encryption Standard (AES) 2001
FIPS PUB 198 The Keyed-Hash Message Authentication Code (HMAC) 2002

Internet Requests for Comments (RFCs)

Classified Standards
 EKMS NSA's Electronic Key Management System
 FNBDT NSA's secure narrow band voice standard
 Fortezza encryption based on portable crypto token in PC Card format
 STE secure telephone
 STU-III older secure telephone
 TEMPEST prevents compromising emanations

Other 
 IPsec Virtual Private Network (VPN) and more
 IEEE P1363 covers most aspects of public-key cryptography
 Transport Layer Security (formerly SSL)
 SSH secure Telnet and more
 Content Scrambling System (CSS, the DVD encryption standard, broken by DeCSS)
 Kerberos authentication standard
 RADIUS authentication standard
 ANSI X9.59 electronic payment standard
 Common Criteria Trusted operating system standard
 CRYPTREC Japanese Government's cryptography recommendations

See also

 Topics in cryptography

 
Technology-related lists